Maidanik, Maidannik and Maidanchik (Майданик, Майданник, Майданчик) are Jewish surnames originated in the Russian Empire.  Maidannik or Maidannik is also a Ukrainian surname. They were derived from the Ukrainian word maidannink, which means "worker in tar". In the Russian language, maidannik also means "con man operating in a marketplace" (from the word "maidan"). A similar sounding Croatian surname is Maidandzic (Majdandžić), possibly unrelated. 

Maidanik or Maydanik may refer to:

Kiva Maidanik, a Soviet Russian historian and political scientist
Yuri Maidanik, inventor of the loop heat pipe and a 1999 recipient of the State Prize of the Russian Federation in science and technology

Maidannik or Maydannik may refer to:

Igor Maidannik, executive vice president for legal support of the TNK-BP Russian oil company

References

Jewish surnames
Ukrainian-language surnames